Acanthoprora is a genus of moths of the family Noctuidae.

Species
 Acanthoprora melanoleuca Hampson, 1926
 Acanthoprora streblomita Turner, 1929

References
Natural History Museum Lepidoptera genus database

Calpinae
Noctuoidea genera